The JIE may be:

 Journal of Interdisciplinary Economics, an academic journal in the United Kingdom
 Jakarta International Expo, an exhibition center in Jakarta, Indonesia
 Joint Information Environment, an abstraction of the United States Department of Defense joint computer networks